Light effects on circadian rhythm are the effects that light has on circadian rhythm.

Most animals and other organisms have "built-in clocks" in their brains that regulate the timing of biological processes and daily behavior.  These "clocks" are known as circadian rhythms.  They allow maintenance of these processes and behaviors relative to the 24-hour day/night cycle in nature.  Although these rhythms are maintained by the individual organisms, their length does vary somewhat individually.  Therefore, they must, either continually or repeatedly, be reset to synchronize with nature's cycle.  In order to maintain synchronization ("entrainment") to 24 hours, external factors must play some role. The human circadian rhythm occurs typically in accordance with nature's cycle. The average activity rhythm cycle is 24.18 hours in adulthood but is shortened as age increases.  One of the various factors that influence this entrainment is light exposure to the eyes. When an organism is exposed to a specific wavelength of light stimulus at certain times throughout the day, the hormone melatonin is suppressed, or prevented from being secreted by the pineal gland.

Mechanism 

Light first passes into a mammal's system through the retina, then takes one of two paths: the light gets collected by rod cells and cone cells and the retinal ganglion cells (RGCs), or it is directly collected by these RGCs.

The RGCs use the photopigment melanopsin to absorb the light energy. Specifically, this class of RGCs being discussed is referred to as "intrinsically photosensitive," which just means they are sensitive to light. There are five known types of intrinsically photosensitive retinal ganglion cells (ipRGCs): M1, M2, M3, M4, and M5. Each of these differently ipRGC types have different melanopsin content and photosensitivity. These connect to amacrine cells in the inner plexiform layer of the retina. Ultimately, via this retinohypothalamic tract (RHT) the suprachiasmatic nucleus (SCN) of the hypothalamus receives light information from these ipRGCs.

The ipRGCs serve a different function than rods and cones, even when isolated from the other components of the retina, ipRGCs maintain their photo-sensitivity and as a result can be sensitive to different ranges of the light spectrum. Additionally, ipRGC firing patterns may respond to light conditions as low as 1 lux whereas previous research indicated 2500 lux was required to suppress melatonin production. Circadian and other behavioral responses have shown to be more sensitive at lower wavelengths than the photopic luminous efficiency function which is based on sensitivity to cone receptor.

The core region of the SCN houses the majority of light-sensitive neurons. From here, signals are transmitted via a nerve connection with the pineal gland which regulates various hormones in the human body.

There are specific genes that determine the regulation of circadian rhythm in conjunction with light. When light activates NMDA receptors in the SCN, CLOCK gene expression in that region is altered and the SCN is reset, and this is how entrainment occurs. Genes also involved with entrainment are PER1 and PER2.

Some important structures directly impacted by the light-sleep relationship are the superior colliculus-pretectal area and the ventrolateral pre-optic nucleus.

Effects

Primary 
All of the mechanisms of light-affected entrainment are not yet fully known, however numerous studies have demonstrated the effectiveness of light entrainment to the day/night cycle. Studies have shown that the timing of exposure to light influences entrainment; as seen on the phase response curve for light for a given species. In diurnal (day-active) species, exposure to light soon after wakening advances the circadian rhythm, whereas exposure before sleeping delays the rhythm. An advance means that the individual will tend to wake up earlier on the following day(s).  A delay, caused by light exposure before sleeping, means that the individual will tend to wake up later on the following day(s).

The hormones cortisol and melatonin are affected by the signals light sends through the body's nervous system. These hormones help regulate blood sugar to give the body the appropriate amount of energy that is required throughout the day. Cortisol levels are high upon waking and gradually decrease over the course of the day, melatonin levels are high when the body is entering and exiting a sleeping status and are very low over the course of waking hours. The earth's natural light-dark cycle is the basis for the release of these hormones.

The length of light exposure influences entrainment. Longer exposures have a greater effect than shorter exposures. Consistent light exposure has a greater effect than intermittent exposure. In rats, constant light eventually disrupts the cycle to the point that memory and stress coping may be impaired.

The intensity and the wavelength of light influence entrainment. Dim light can affect entrainment relative to darkness. Brighter light is more effective than dim light. In humans, a lower intensity short wavelength (blue/violet) light appears to be equally effective as a higher intensity of white light.

Exposure to monochromatic light at the wavelengths of 460 nm and 550 nm on two control groups yielded results showing decreased sleepiness at 460 nm tested over two groups and a control group. Additionally, in the same study but testing thermoregulation and heart rate researchers found significantly increased heart rate in 460 nm light over the course of a 1.5 hour exposure period.

In a study done on the effect of lighting intensity on delta waves, a measure of sleepiness, high levels of lighting (1700 lux) showed lower levels of delta waves measured through an EEG than low levels of lighting (450 lux). This shows that lighting intensity is directly correlated with alertness in an office environment.

Humans are sensitive to light with a short wavelength. Specifically, melanopsin is sensitive to blue light with a wavelength of approximately 480 nanometers. The effect this wavelength of light has on melanopsin leads to physiological responses such as the suppression of melatonin production, increased alertness, and alterations to the circadian rhythm.

Secondary 
While light has direct effects on circadian rhythm, there are indirect effects seen across studies. Seasonal affective disorder creates a model in which decreased day length during autumn and winter increases depressive symptoms. A shift in the circadian phase response curve creates a connection between the amount of light in a day (day length) and depressive symptoms in this disorder. Light seems to have therapeutic antidepressant effects when an organism is exposed to it at appropriate times during the circadian rhythm, regulating the sleep-wake cycle.

In addition to mood, learning and memory become impaired when the circadian system shifts due to light stimuli, which can be seen in studies modeling jet lag and shift work situations. Frontal and parietal lobe areas involved in working memory have been implicated in melanopsin responses to light information.

"In 2007, the International Agency for Research on Cancer classified shift work with circadian disruption or chronodisruption as a probable human carcinogen."

Exposure to light during the hours of melatonin production reduces melatonin production. Melatonin has been shown to mitigate the growth of tumors in rats. By suppressing the production of melatonin over the course of the night rats showed increased rates of tumors over the course of a four-week period.

Artificial light at night causing circadian disruption additionally impacts sex steroid production. Increased levels of progestogens and androgens was found in night shift workers as compared to "working hour" workers.

The proper exposure to light has become an accepted way to alleviate some of the effects of SAD. In addition exposure to light in the morning has been shown to assist Alzheimer patients in regulating their waking patterns.

In response to light exposure, alertness levels can increase as a result of suppression of melatonin secretion. A linear relationship has been found between alerting effects of light and activation in the posterior hypothalamus.

Disruption of circadian rhythm as a result of light also produces changes in metabolism.

Measured lighting for rating systems 
Historically light was measured in the units of luminous intensity (candelas), luminance (candelas/m2) and illuminance (lumen/m2). After the discovery of ipRGCs in 2002 additional units of light measurement have been researched in order to better estimate the impact of different inputs of the spectrum of light on various photoreceptors. However, due to the variability in sensitivity between rods, cones and ipRGCs and variability between the different ipRGC types a singular unit does not perfectly reflect the effects of light on the human body.

The accepted current unit is equivalent melanopic lux which is a calculated ratio multiplied by the unit lux. The melanopic ratio is determined taking into account the source type of light and the melanopic illuminance values for the eye's photopigments. The source of light, the unit used to measure illuminance and the value of illuminance informs the spectral power distribution. This is used to calculate the Photopic illuminance and the melanopic lux for the five photopigments of the human eye, which is weighted based on the optical density of each photopigment.

The WELL Building standard was designed for "advancing health and well-being in buildings globally" Part of the standard is the implementation of Credit 54: Circadian Lighting Design. Specific thresholds for different office areas are designated in order to achieve credits. Light is measured at 1.2 meters above the finished floor for all areas.

Work areas must have at least a value of 200 equivalent melanopic lux present for 75% or more work stations between the hours of 9:00 A.M. and 1:00 P.M. for each day of the year when daylight is incorporated into calculations. If daylight is not taken into account all workstations require lighting at the value of 150 equivalent melanopic lux or greater.

Living environments, which are bedrooms, bathrooms and rooms with windows, at least one fixture must provide a melanopic lux value of at least 200 during the day and a melanopic lux value less than 50 during the night, measured .76 meters above the finished floor.

Breakrooms require an average melanopic lux of 250.

The WELL Building standard additionally provides direction for circadian emulation in multi-family residences. In order to more accurately replicate natural cycles lighting users must be able to set a wake and bed time. An equivalent melanopic lux of 250 must be maintained in the period of the day between the indicated wake time and two hours before the indicated bed time. An equivalent melanopic lux of 50 or less is required for the period of the day spanning from two hours before the indicated bed time through the wake time. In addition at the indicated wake time melanopic lux should increase from 0 to 250 over the course of at least 15 minutes.

Other factors
Although many researchers consider light to be the strongest cue for entrainment, it is not the only factor acting on circadian rhythms. Other factors may enhance or decrease the effectiveness of entrainment. For instance, exercise and other physical activity, when coupled with light exposure, results in a somewhat stronger entrainment response. Other factors such as music and properly timed administration of the neurohormone melatonin have shown similar effects. Numerous other factors affect entrainment as well. These include feeding schedules, temperature, pharmacology, locomotor stimuli, social interaction, sexual stimuli and stress.

See also 
 Chronobiology
 Circadian advantage
 Circadian clock
 Circadian oscillator
 Circadian rhythm disorders
 Electronic media and sleep
 Light therapy
 Scotobiology

References 

Circadian rhythm
Circadian
Health effects by subject